Scottish lion may refer to

 the Royal Banner of Scotland
 the lion in the Royal coat of arms of Scotland
 British big cats, alleged big feline creatures living on the British Isles